Einhausen may refer to:

 Einhausen, Hesse
 Einhausen, Thuringia